David Hartley the Younger (1732 – 19 December 1813) was a statesman, a scientific inventor and the son of the philosopher David Hartley. He was Member of Parliament (MP) for Kingston upon Hull, and also held the position of His Britannic Majesty's Minister Plenipotentiary, appointed by King George III to treat with the United States of America as to American independence and other issues after the American Revolution. He was a signatory to the 1783 Treaty of Paris, which ended the American Revolutionary War. Hartley was the first MP to put the case for abolition of the slave trade before the House of Commons, moving a resolution in 1776 that "the slave trade is contrary to the laws of God and the rights of men".

Life
Hartley was born in Bath, Somerset, England in 1732. He matriculated at Corpus Christi College, Oxford on 6 April 1747 at the age of 15. He was awarded his B.A. on 14 March 1750 and was a fellow of Merton College, Oxford until his death.
He became a student of Lincoln's Inn in 1759. During the 1760s he gained recognition as a scientist and, through mutual interests, he met and became an intimate friend and
correspondent of Benjamin Franklin. Hartley was sympathetic to the Lord Rockingham's Whigs, although he did not hold office in either Rockingham ministry.
He represented Kingston upon Hull in parliament from 1774 to 1780, and from 1782 to 1784, and attained considerable reputation as an opponent of the war with America, and of the African slave trade.

He was expert in public finance and spoke frequently in Parliament in opposition to the war in America. Although a liberal on American policy, Hartley was a long-time friend of Lord North
and strongly disliked the Prime Minister, Shelburne. He supported the Coalition by voting against Shelburne's peace preliminaries.  It was probably owing to his friendship with Benjamin Franklin, and to his consistent support of Lord Rockingham, that he was selected by the government to act as plenipotentiary in Paris, where, on 3 September 1783, he and Franklin drew up and signed the definitive treaty of peace between Great Britain and the United States.

Hartley died at Bath on 19 December 1813 in his eighty-second year.

His portrait was painted by George Romney and has been engraved by J. Walker in mezzotint. Nathaniel William Wraxall says that Hartley, "though destitute of all personal recommendation of manner, possessed some talent with unsullied probity, added to indefatigable perseverance and labour." He adds that his speeches were intolerably long and dull, and that "his rising always operated like a dinner bell" (Memoirs, iii. 490).

Writings
Hartley's writings are mostly political, and set forth the arguments of the extreme liberals of his time.  In 1764 he wrote a vigorous attack on the Bute administration, "inscribed to the man who thinks himself a minister."  His most important writings are his Letters on the American War, published in London in 1778 and 1779, and addressed to his constituents. "The road," he writes, "is open to national reconciliation between Great Britain and America. The ministers have no national object in view . . . the object was to establish an influential dominion of the crown by means of an independent American revenue uncontrolled by parliament." He seeks throughout to vindicate the opposition to the war. In 1794 he printed at Bath a sympathetic Argument on the French Revolution, addressed to his parliamentary electors.

Hartley edited his father's well-known Observations on Man, in London 1791 and (with notes and additions) in 1801.

In 1859 a number of Hartley's papers were sold in London. Six volumes of letters and other documents relating to the peace went to America and passed into the collection of L.Z. Leiter of Washington, D.C.; others are in the British Museum.

Inventions
In his last years, Hartley studied chemistry and mechanics. In 1774 he published Account of a Method of Securing Buildings and Ships against Fire, by placing thin iron planks under floors and attaching them to the ceilings, partly to prevent immediate access of the fire, and partly to stop the free supply of air. He built a house on Putney Heath to verify the efficacy of his invention. An obelisk was built on the heath, adjacent to Tibbet's corner, 1776 marking the Lord Mayor of London's decision to give Hartley £2,500 for work on his fire plates. It makes mention of its being erected on the 110th anniversary of the Great Fire of London. On the occasion of a fire at Richmond House, on 21 December 1791, he wrote a pamphlet urging the value of his fire plates.

The brick obelisk with heavily inscribed foundation stone still stands on Putney Heath, near where the A219 veers from the A3 at Tibbet's Corner, towards Putney. There is no parking at the site; however there is parking and footpath access from near the adjacent Telegraph Pub, off Wildcroft Road. Since 1955 the obelisk has been a Grade II listed building.

The inscription reads:

''– South face (towards the A3):

– East face:

– North Face (towards the car park and public house):

– West face:

See also
List of abolitionist forerunners

References

Attribution:

Members of the Parliament of Great Britain for English constituencies
British officials in the American Revolution
English abolitionists
English inventors
Alumni of Corpus Christi College, Oxford
People from Bath, Somerset
1732 births
1813 deaths
Fellows of Merton College, Oxford
British MPs 1774–1780
British MPs 1780–1784